Soosalu may refer to several places in Estonia:

Soosalu, Järva County, village in Albu Parish, Järva County
Soosalu, Pärnu County, village in Halinga Parish, Pärnu County
Soosalu, Rapla County, village in Märjamaa Parish, Rapla County